Dakkah is a kind of external couch attached to the house, usually built of bricks or the same material as the house and then covered with fabric. Dakkahs were very common in the traditional buildings of the Arab World, people gathering on the dakkas to talk and sip tea.

The dakkah is found more often in rural settings, where the house faces a farm or an open space. It is used for informal visits, whereas the majlis is used for formal visits.

See also 
 Dikka

External links
 Glossaire des Mots Espagnols et Portugais Derivés de l'Arabe, R. Dozy & W. A. Engelmann. p. 46 

Arabic architecture
Couches